The non-marine molluscs of Ecuador are a part of the wildlife of Ecuador (fauna of Ecuador).

167 species of land snail from Orthalicoidea have been recorded from Ecuador (63 of them in Galapagos).

Freshwater gastropods

Land gastropods 

Achatinidae
 Protobeliscus cuneus (L. Pfeiffer, 1852)
 Rhodea cousini Jousseaume, 1900
 Zoniferella riveti (Germain, 1907)

Helicinidae
 Bourciera fraseri (Pfeiffer, 1859)
 Bourciera helicinaeformis (Pfeiffer, 1853)
 Bourciera viridissima (Miller, 1879)
Neocyclotidae
 Calaperostoma nigrofasciatum (Miller, 1879)

Orthalicidae

 Plekocheilus cardinalis (Pfeiffer, 1853)
 Plekocheilus aristaceus (Crosse, 1869)
 Plekocheilus aureonitens (Miller, 1878)
 Plekocheilus corydon (Crosse, 1869)
 Plekocheilus doliarius (Da Costa, 1898)
 Plekocheilus eros (Angas, 1878)
 Plekocheilus floccosus (Spix, 1827)
 Plekocheilus jimenezi (Hidalgo, 1872) - Plekocheilus jimenezi oligostylus Pilsbry, 1939
 Plekocheilus lynciculus (Deville & Hupé, 1850)
 Plekocheilus mcgintyi 'Pilsbry' H. B. Baker, 1963
 Plekocheilus nocturnus Pilsbry, 1939
 Plekocheilus phoebus (Pfeiffer, 1863)
 Plekocheilus pulicarius (Reeve, 1848)
 Plekocheilus roseolabrum (E. A. Smith, 1877)
 Plekocheilus taylorianus (Reeve, 1849)
 Plekocheilus tricolor (Pfeiffer, 1853)
 Plekocheilus tenuissimus (Weyrauch, 1967)
 Thaumastus thompsonii (Pfeiffer, 1845)
 Thaumastus thompsonoides Oberwimmer, 1931
 Thaumastus jaspideus (Morelet, 1863)
 Thaumastus sarcochrous (Pilsbry, 1897)
 Thaumastus brunneus Strebel, 1910
 Thaumastus buckleyi (Higgins, 1872)
 Thaumastus flori (Jousseaume, 1897)
 Thaumastus hartwegi (Pfeiffer, 1846)
 Thaumastus indentatus (Da Costa, 1901)
 Thaumastus integer (Pfeiffer, 1855)
 Thaumastus loxostomus (Pfeiffer, 1853)
 Thaumastus orcesi Weyrauch, 1967
 Bostryx bilineatus (Sowerby, 1833)
 ?Bostryx ceroplastus (Pilsbry, 1896)
 Bostryx juana (Cousin, 1887)
 Bulimulus fontainii (d’Orbigny, 1837)
 Naesiotus achatinellus (Forbes, 1850) / Bulimulus achatellinus
 Naesiotus adelphus (Dall, 1917) / Bulimulus adelphus
 Naesiotus adserseni (Coppois, 1985) / Bulimulus adserseni (Coppois, 1985)
 Naesiotus akamatus (Dall, 1917) / Bulimulus akamatus
 Naesiotus albemarlensis (Dall, 1917) / Bulimulus albermalensis
 Naesiotus alethorhytidus (Dall, 1917) / Bulimulus alethorhytidus
 Naesiotus amastroides (Ancey, 1887) / Bulimulus amastroides
 Naesiotus approximatus (Dall, 1900)
 Naesiotus bauri (Dall, 1893)
 Naesiotus blombergi (Odhner, 1951) / Bulimulus blombergi
 Naesiotus calvus (Sowerby, 1833) / Bulimulus calvus
 Naesiotus canaliferus (Reibisch, 1892)
 Naesiotus cavagnaroi A. G. Smith, 1972 / Bulimulus cavagnaroi
 Naesiotus chemnitzoides (Forbes, 1850) / Bulimulus chemitzioides
 Naesiotus cinerarius (Dall, 1917) / Bulimulus cinerarius
 Naesiotus cucullinus (Dall, 1917) / Bulimulus cucullinus
 Naesiotus curtus (Reibisch, 1892) / Bulimulus curtus
 Naesiotus cymatias (Dall, 1917)
 Naesiotus darwini (Pfeiffer, 1846) / Bulimulus darwini
 Naesiotus deroyi A. G. Smith, 1972
 Naesiotus deridderi / Bulimulus deridderi (Coppois, 1985)
 Naesiotus duncanus (Dall, 1893) / Bulimulus duncanus
 Naesiotus elaeodes (Dall, 1917) / Bulimulus elaeodes
 Naesiotus eos Odhner, 1951 / Bulimulus eos
 Naesiotus eschariferus (Sowerby, 1833) / Bulimulus eschariferus (Ancey, 1887)
 Naesiotus florschuetzi Breure, 1978
 Naesiotus galapaganus (Pfeiffer, 1855) / Bulimulus galapaganus
 Naesiotus gilderoyi (Van Mol, 1972)
 Naesiotus habeli (Dall, 1892) / Bulimulus habeli
 Naesiotus hemaerodes (Dall, 1917) / Bulimulus hemaerodes
 Naesiotus hirsutus Vagvolgyi, 1977 / Bulimulus hirsutus
 Naesiotus hoodensis (Dall, 1900) / Bulimulus hoodensis
 Naesiotus indefatigabilis (Dall, 1900) / Bulimulus indefatigabilis
 Naesiotus jacobi (Sowerby, 1833) / Bulimulus jacobi
 Naesiotus jervisensis (Dall & Ochsner, 1917) / Bulimulus jervisensis
 Naesiotus kublerensis Chambers, 1986
 Naesiotus lycodus (Dall, 1917) / Bulimulus lycodus
 Naesiotus nesioticus (Dall, 1896) / Bulimulus nesioticus
 Naesiotus nucula (Pfeiffer, 1854) / Bulimulus nucula
 Naesiotus nux (Broderip, 1832) / Bulimulus nux
 Naesiotus ochseneri (Dall, 1893) / Bulimulus ochsneri
 Naesiotus olla (Dall, 1893) / Bulimulus olla
 Naesiotus pallidus (Reibisch, 1892) / Bulimulus pallidus
 Naesiotus perrus (Dall, 1917) / Bulimulus perrus
 Naesiotus perspectivus (Pfeiffer, 1846) / Bulimulus perspectivus
 Naesiotus pinzonensis Vagvolgyi, 1977
 Naesiotus pinzonopsis Vagvolgyi, 1977
 Naesiotus planospira (Ancey, 1887) / Bulimulus planospira (Ancey, 1887)
 Naesiotus prepinguis Vagvolgyi, 1977
 Naesiotus quitensis (Pfeiffer, 1848) - Naesiotus quitensis ambatensis Rehder, 1940; Naesiotus quitensis orinus Rehder, 1940; Naesiotus quitensis vermiculatus Rehder, 1940
 Naesiotus rabidensis (Dall, 1917) / Bulimulus rabidensis
 Naesiotus reibischii (Dall, 1895) / Bulimulus reibischi
 Naesiotus rugatinus (Dall, 1917) / Bulimulus rugatinus
 Naesiotus rugiferus (Sowerby, 1833) / Bulimulus rugiferus
 Naesiotus rugulosus (Sowerby, 1838?) / Bulimulus rugulosus
 Naesiotus saeronius (Dall, 1917) / Bulimulus saeronius
 Naesiotus sculpturatus (Pfeiffer, 1846) / Bulimulus sculpturatus
 Naesiotus simrothi (Reibisch, 1892) / Bulimulus simrothi
 Naesiotus snodgrassi (Dall, 1900)
 Naesiotus steadmani Chambers, 1986
 Bulimulus sp. nov. 'josevillani'
 Bulimulus sp. nov. 'krameri'
 Bulimulus sp. nov. 'nilsodhneri'
 Bulimulus sp. nov. 'tuideroyi'
 Bulimulus sp. nov. 'vanmoli'
 Naesiotus tanneri (Dall, 1895) / Bulimulus tanneri - Naesiotus tanneri bartolomensis Vagvolgyi, 1977; Naesiotus tanneri edenensis Vagvolgyi, 1977
 Naesiotus tortuganus (Dall, 1893) / Bulimulus tortuganus
 Naesiotus trogonius (Dall, 1917) / Bulimulus trogonius
 Naesiotus unifasciatus (Sowerby, 1833) / Bulimulus unifasciatus
 Naesiotus ustulatus (Sowerby, 1833) / Bulimulus ustulatus
 Naesiotus ventrosus (Reibisch, 1892)
 Naesiotus wolfi (Reibisch, 1892) / Bulimulus wolfi
 Scutalus aequatorius (Pfeiffer, 1853)
 Scutalus anthisanensis (Pfeiffer, 1853)
 Scutalus cousini (Jousseaume, 1887)
 Stenostylus colmeiroi (Hidalgo, 1872)
 ?Stenostylus guttulus (Pfeiffer, 1854)
 Drymaeus aequatorianus (E. A. Smith, 1877)
 Drymaeus albolabiatus (E. A. Smith, 1877)
 Drymaeus ambustus (Reeve, 1849)
 Drymaeus andai (Jousseaume, 1898)
 Drymaeus baezensis (Hidalgo, 1869)
 Drymaeus bourcieri (Pfeiffer, 1853)
 Drymaeus buckleyi (Sowerby, 1895)
 Drymaeus chimborasensis (Reeve, 1848)
 Drymaeus decoratus (Lea, 1838)
 Drymaeus elegantissimus (Mousson, 1873)
 Drymaeus expansus (Pfeiffer, 1848) - Drymaeus expansus altorum (Weyrauch, 1958); Drymaeus expansus orcesi (Weyrauch, 1958)
 Drymaeus fallax (Pfeiffer, 1853)
 Drymaeus fordii Pilsbry, 1898
 Drymaeus fucatus (Reeve, 1849)
 ?Drymaeus fusoides (d’Orbigny, 1835)
 Drymaeus hidalgoi (Da Costa, 1898)
 Drymaeus inaequalis (Pfeiffer, 1857)
 Drymaeus membielinus (Crosse, 1867)
 Drymaeus murrinus (Reeve, 1848)
 Drymaeus nystianus (Pfeiffer, 1853)
 Drymaeus ochrocheilus (E. A. Smith, 1877)
 Drymaeus orthostomus (E. A. Smith, 1877)
 Drymaeus peeliii (Reeve, 1859)
 Drymaeus petasites (Miller, 1878)
 Drymaeus planibasis Pilsbry, 1932
 Drymaeus quadrifasciatus (Angas, 1878)
 Drymaeus rabuti (Jousseaume, 1898)
 Drymaeus rhoadsi Pilsbry, 1932
 Drymaeus rubrovariegatus (Higgins, 1868)
 Drymaeus sachsei (Albers, 1854)
 ?Drymaeus scitulus (Reeve, 1849)

 Drymaeus strigatus (Sowerby, 1833) - synonym: Drymaeus tigrinus (Da Costa, 1898)
 Drymaeus subeffusus (Philippi, 1869)
 Drymaeus violaceus (Mousson, 1873)
 Drymaeus volsus Fulton, 1907
 Drymaeus cactivorus (Broderip, 1832)
 ?Drymaeus fidustus (Reeve, 1849)
 Drymaeus flavidulus (E. A. Smith, 1877)
 Drymaeus loxanus (Higgins, 1872)
 Drymaeus loxensis (Pfeiffer, 1846)
 ?Drymaeus nigrofasciatus - Drymaeus nigrofasciatus elongatulus Pilsbry, 1898
 ?Drymaeus serenus (Philippi, 1867)
 Drymaeus subpellucidus (E. A. Smith, 1877)
 Drymaeus wintlei Finch, 1929
 Simpulopsis citrinovitrea (Moricand, 1836)
 Sultana sultana (Dillwyn, 1817)
 Sultana augusti (Jousseaume, 1887)
 Sultana deburghiae (Reeve, 1859)
 Sultana kellettii (Reeve, 1850)
 Sultana fraseri (Pfeiffer, 1858)

 Orthalicus bensoni (Reeve, 1849)
 Orthalicus bifulguratus (Reeve, 1849)
 Orthalicus maracaibensis (Pfeiffer, 1856)
 Orthalicus mars (Pfeiffer, 1861)

 Corona pfeifferi (Hidalgo, 1869)
 Corona regalis (Hupé, 1857)
 Corona regina (Férussac, 1823)
 Corona rosenbergi Strebel, 1909
 Porphyrobaphe iostoma (Sowerby, 1824)
 Porphyrobaphe saturnus (Pfeiffer, 1860)
 Porphyrobabphe irrorata (Reeve, 1849)
 Porphyrobaphe subirroratus (Da Costa, 1898)
 Hemibulimus excisus (Martens, 1885)
 Hemibulimus magnificus (Pfeiffer, 1848)

Solaropsidae
 Solaropsis selenostoma (Pfeiffer, 1854)

Freshwater bivalves

See also 
 List of marine molluscs of Ecuador
 List of non-marine molluscs of Colombia
 List of non-marine molluscs of Peru

External links
 
 
 Correoso M.R. (2010). Nuevo reporte y localidades de Rhodea cousini Jousseaume, 1900 (Gastropoda: Subulinidae) para el Ecuador. Revista Geospacial (Quito) 7: 45–51. es.scribd.com/doc/86570280/Revista-Geoespacial-7
 Correoso, M.R. (2008).  Los moluscos terrestres y fluviales del Ecuador continental. La biodiversidad desconocida. . Editorial SIMBIOE. Quito Ecuador .2008  http://www.librimundi.com/libros/9978995919.
 Correoso et al (2015)."Pomacea canaliculata  plaga del arroz en Ecuador" 1 edición digital ESPE, Quito Ecuador repositorio.espe.edu.ec/handle/21000/101701
 Correoso and Coello.(2017). "Pomacea canaliculata in Ecuador a recent pest with multiple implications" 2017. in Biology and management of invasive apple snails Published by the Philippine Rice Research Institute (PhilRice).  (Softbound)  (Hardbound)

References 

Molluscs
Ecuador
Molluscs
Ecuador
Ecuador